The 1969 Seattle Pilots season was the only season of the Seattle Pilots, a Major League Baseball team. As an expansion team in the American League, along with the Kansas City Royals, the Pilots were placed in the newly established West division. They finished last among the six teams with a record of 64–98, 33 games behind the division champion Minnesota Twins.

Fewer than 678,000 fans came to see the Pilots, which ranked 20th of the 24 major league teams — a major reason why the team was forced into bankruptcy after only one season. Despite the poor conditions at aging Sick's Stadium, the ticket prices were among the highest in the major leagues. The bankruptcy sale of the team was approved by a federal court in Seattle on March 31, and the team moved to Milwaukee at the end of spring training for the 1970 season and became the Milwaukee Brewers. Milwaukee had lost the Braves to Atlanta after the 1965 season.

A book about the season exists called The 1969 Seattle Pilots: Major League Baseball's One-Year Team. Part of the Pilots' season was also documented in the book Ball Four by Jim Bouton.

After the Pilots, there would not be another MLB team in Seattle until the birth of the Mariners in 1977.

The last remaining active member of the 1969 Seattle Pilots was Fred Stanley, who retired after the 1982 season.

Offseason 
 April 1, 1968: Marv Staehle was purchased by the Pilots from the Cleveland Indians.
 June 7, 1968: Wilbur Howard was selected by the Pilots in the 19th round of the 1968 Major League Baseball draft.
 October 21, 1968: Jim Bouton was purchased by the Pilots from the New York Yankees.
 March 31, 1969: Chico Salmon was traded by the Pilots to the Baltimore Orioles for Gene Brabender and Gordy Lund.

Expansion draft 

The MLB expansion draft for the Pilots and the Kansas City Royals was held on October 15, 1968.

1968 MLB June amateur draft and minor league affiliates 
The Pilots and Kansas City Royals, along with the two National League expansion teams set to debut in 1969, the Montreal Expos and San Diego Padres, were allowed to participate in the June 1968 MLB first-year player draft, although the new teams were barred from the lottery's first three rounds. The Pilots drafted 29 players in the 1968 June draft, including future major league manager Tom Kelly (eighth round) and starting pitcher Bill Parsons (seventh round). Seattle affiliated with one minor league club during 1968 to develop drafted players; the roster was filled out by professional and amateur free agents that had been signed and players loaned from other organizations.

1968 farm system

Regular season 
On Tuesday, April 8, the Pilots won their first-ever game, 4–3 at Anaheim Stadium over the California Angels. Twenty-six-year-old Pilots' starter Marty Pattin went five innings, allowing two earned runs for Seattle. RHP Jack Aker earned the save. RF Mike Hegan hit Seattle's first-ever HR, a two-run shot off Jim McGlothlin CAL, after 2b Tommy Harper SEA had doubled to left to begin the Pilots' existence.
On the afternoon of Friday, April 11, the Pilots played, and won, their first American League game at Sick's Stadium in Seattle – 7–0 over the Chicago White Sox. Thirty-two-year-old righty Gary Bell tossed a complete game for Seattle, scattering nine hits, striking out six Sox and walking four. Bell also helped his own cause by stroking a two-run double off RHP Bob Locker in the bottom of the sixth. Seattle 1b Don Mincher hit a two-run HR off RHP Joe Horlen in the third. The official attendance was 14,993.
On July 2, Reggie Jackson of the Oakland Athletics hit three home runs against the Pilots to raise his season total to 34 home runs.
In the 1969 Major League Baseball All-Star Game, outfielder Mike Hegan was the only Pilot selected to the All-Star game on the reserved squad. However, due to injury, he would be replaced by his teammate, infielder Don Mincher.
On October 2, the Pilots, at home, played their last ever game, losing 3-1 to Oakland in front of 5,473 fans.  In the final inning, Steve Whitaker hit the Pilots' last ever home run, Greg Goossen got their last ever hit (a single), and Jerry McNertney struck out for their last ever play.  Steve Barber took the loss.

Season standings

Record vs. opponents

The first game 
April 8, Anaheim Stadium, Anaheim, California

Opening Day Lineup

Notable transactions 
 April 1: Lou Piniella was traded by the Pilots to the Kansas City Royals for Steve Whitaker and John Gelnar.
 May 27: Jim Pagliaroni was purchased by the Pilots from the Oakland Athletics.
 June 5: 1969 Major League Baseball draft
Gorman Thomas was selected by the Pilots in the first round (21st pick).
Bob Coluccio was selected by the Pilots in the 17th round.
 June 14: Larry Haney was traded by the Pilots to the Oakland Athletics for John Donaldson.
 August 24: Jim Bouton was traded by the Pilots to the Houston Astros for Dooley Womack and Roric Harrison.
 September 13: Marv Staehle was purchased from the Pilots by the Montreal Expos.

Roster

Game log 

|-style=background:#cfc
| 1 || April 8 || @ Angels|| 4–3 ||Pattin||McGlothlin||Aker|| 11,930 || 1–0 || W1 
|-style=background:#fbb
| 2 || April 9 || @ Angels|| 3–7 ||Borbon||Brabender||Wilhelm|| 5,347 || 1–1 || L1
|-style=background:#cfc
| 3 || April 11 ||White Sox|| 7–0 ||Bell||Horlen|| — || 14,993 || 2–1 || W1
|-style=background:#cfc
| 4 || April 12 ||White Sox|| 5–1 ||Segui||Ellis||Aker|| 8,319 || 3–1 || W2
|-style=background:#fbb
| 5 || April 13 ||White Sox|| 7–12 ||Wood||Pattin|| — || 10,031 || 3–2 || L1
|-style=background:#fbb
| 6 || April 14 ||Royals|| 1–2 ||Nelson||Marshall||Wickersham|| 3,611 || 3–3 || L2
|-style=background:#fbb
| 7 || April 16 ||Twins|| 4–6 ||Perranoski||Aker|| — || 7,329 || 3–4 || L3
|-style=background:#bbb
| — || April 18 || @ White Sox|| colspan="7" |Postponed (Makeup June 18)
|-style=background:#cfc
| 8 || April 19 || @ White Sox|| 5–1 ||Pattin||Peters||Segui|| 3,901 || 4–4 || W1
|-style=background:#fbb
| 9 || April 20 || @ White Sox|| 2–3 (10)||Wood||Segui|| — || 12,579 || 4–5 || L1
|-style=background:#fbb
| 10 || April 20 || @ White Sox|| 3–13 ||Horlen||Barber||Locker|| 12,579 || 4–6 || L2
|-style=background:#cfc
| 11 || April 21 || @ Royals|| 4–1 ||Marshall||Jones||Aker|| 9,024 || 5–6 || W1
|-style=background:#fbb
| 12 || April 22 || @ Royals|| 1–2 ||Hedlund||Segui||Drabowsky|| 9,066 || 5–7 || L1
|-style=background:#fbb
| 13 || April 23 || @ Royals|| 3–4 ||Morehead||Edgerton|| — || 10,267 || 5–8 || L2
|-style=background:#fbb
| 14 || April 25 ||Athletics|| 2–14 ||Nash||Bell|| — || 6,617 || 5–9 || L3
|-style=background:#cfc
| 15 || April 26 ||Athletics|| 6–3 ||Barber||Dobson||Segui|| 6,658 || 6–9 || W1
|-style=background:#fbb
| 16 || April 27 ||Athletics|| 5–13 ||Fingers||Marshall||Krausse|| 5,802 || 6–10 || L1
|-style=background:#bbb
| — || April 28 ||Angels|| colspan="7" |Postponed (Makeup July 9)
|-style=background:#cfc
| 17 || April 29 ||Angels|| 1–0 ||Pattin||McGlothlin|| — || 1,954 || 7–10 || W1
|-style=background:#fbb
| 18 || April 30 || @ Twins|| 4–6 ||Hall||Brabender||Perranoski|| 4,087 || 7–11 || L1
|-

|-style=background:#fbb
| 19 || May 1 || @ Twins|| 1–4 ||Boswell||Bell||Grzenda|| 6,485 || 7–12 || L2
|-style=background:#fbb
| 20 || May 2 || @ Athletics|| 7–8 ||Lindblad||Aker|| — || 4,823 || 7–13 || L3
|-style=background:#fbb
| 21 || May 3 || @ Athletics|| 2–3 ||Dobson||Marshall|| — || 4,565 || 7–14 || L4
|-style=background:#cfc
| 22 || May 4 || @ Athletics|| 6–4 ||Pattin||Fingers||O'Donoghue|| 10,852 || 8–14 || W1
|-style=background:#fbb
| 23 || May 4 || @ Athletics|| 7–11 ||Odom||Brandon||Lindblad|| 10,852 || 8–15 || L1
|-style=background:#fbb
| 24 || May 6 ||Red Sox|| 2–12 ||Culp||Brabender|| — || 9,427 || 8–16 || L2
|-style=background:#fbb
| 25 || May 7 ||Red Sox|| 4–5 ||Siebert||Bell||Romo|| 7,084 || 8–17 || L3
|-style=background:#cfc
| 26 || May 9 ||Senators|| 2–0 ||Marshall||Coleman|| — || 7,148 || 9–17 || W1
|-style=background:#cfc
| 27 || May 10 ||Senators|| 16–13
|Segui||Higgins
|Bell|| 7,360 || 10–17 || W2
|-style=background:#cfc
| 28 || May 11 ||Senators|| 6–5 ||Segui||Baldwin|| — || 14,363 || 11–17 || W3
|-style=background:#cfc
| 29 || May 12 ||Yankees|| 8–4 ||Pattin||Downing|| — || 8,763 || 12–17 || W4
|-style=background:#cfc
| 30 || May 13 ||Yankees|| 5–3 ||Bell||Stottlemyre||Segui|| 19,072 || 13–17 || W5
|-style=background:#fbb
| 31 || May 14 ||Yankees|| 4–5 ||Burbach||Marshall||Bahnsen|| 12,273 || 13–18 || L1
|-style=background:#cfc
| 32 || May 16 || @ Red Sox|| 10–9 (11)||Bouton||Romo||O'Donoghue|| 33,079 || 14–18 || W1
|-style=background:#fbb
| 33 || May 17 || @ Red Sox|| 1–6 ||Nagy||Bell|| — || 21,172 || 14–19 || L1 
|-style=background:#cfc
| 34 || May 18 || @ Red Sox|| 9–6 ||Marshall||Culp||Segui|| 25,125 || 15–19 || W1 
|-style=background:#fbb
| 35 || May 20 || @ Senators|| 5–6 ||Higgins||Pattin|| — || 6,520 || 15–20 || L1
|-style=background:#cfc
| 36 || May 21 || @ Senators|| 6–2 ||Brabender||Coleman||Segui|| 6,083 || 16–20 || W1
|-style=background:#cfc
| 37 || May 22 || @ Senators|| 7–6 ||Segui||Higgins|| — || 4,242 || 17–20 || W2 
|-style=background:#fbb
| 38 || May 23 || @ Indians|| 1–7 ||Ellsworth||Marshall|| — || 5.633 || 17–21 || L1
|-style=background:#cfc
| 39 || May 24 || @ Indians|| 8–2 ||Talbot||McDowell|| — || 7,094 || 18–21 || W1
|-style=background:#cfc
| 40 || May 25 || @ Indians|| 3–2 ||Segui||Williams||Bell|| 10,558 || 19–21 || W2
|-style=background:#cfc
| 41 || May 27 ||Orioles|| 8–1 ||Brabender||Phoebus|| — || 8,308 || 20–21 || W3
|-style=background:#fbb
| 42 || May 28 ||Orioles|| 5–9 ||McNally||Marshall||Richert|| 21,679 || 20–22 || L1
|-style=background:#bbb
| — || May 29 ||Orioles|| colspan="7" |Postponed (Makeup August 18)
|-style=background:#fbb
| 43 || May 30 ||Tigers|| 5–8 ||Radatz||Pattin||Dobson|| 12,084 || 20–23 || L2 
|-style=background:#fbb
| 44 || May 31 ||Tigers|| 2–3 ||Sparma||Bell|| — || 15,395 || 20–24 || L3
|-

|-style=background:#cfc
| 45 || June 1 ||Tigers|| 8–7 ||Segui||Dobson||O'Donoghue|| 14,201 || 21–24 || W1
|-style=background:#cfc
| 46 || June 2 ||Indians|| 8–2 ||Barber||Pina||Bouton|| 9,044 || 22–24 || W2
|-style=background:#fbb
| 47 || June 3 ||Indians|| 1–3 ||Tiant||Pattin||Williams|| 8,634 || 22–25 || L1
|-style=background:#fbb
| 48 || June 4 ||Indians|| 4–10 ||McDowell||Marshall||Williams|| 9,540 || 22–26 || L2
|-style=background:#fbb
| 49 || June 6 || @ Orioles|| 1–5 ||McNally||Bell|| — || 17,689 || 22–27 || L3
|-style=background:#fbb
| 50 || June 7 || @ Orioles|| 0–10 ||Palmer||Brabender|| — || 13,903 || 22–28 || L4
|-style=background:#cfc
| 51 || June 8 || @ Orioles|| 7–5 ||O'Donoghue||Cuellar|| — || 8,988 || 23–28 || W1
|-style=background:#cfc
| 52 || June 9 || @ Tigers|| 3–2 (10)||Pattin||Dobson||Gelnar|| 13,477 || 24–28 || W2
|-style=background:#fbb
| 53 || June 10 || @ Tigers|| 0–5 ||Wilson||Talbot||McMahon|| 14,033 || 24–29 || L1
|-style=background:#fbb
| 54 || June 11 || @ Tigers|| 3–4 (10)||Dobson||O'Donoghue|| — || 23,569 || 24–30 || L2
|-style=background:#cfc
| 55 || June 13 || @ Yankees|| 2–1 ||Brabender||Stottlemyre|| — || 14,967 || 25–30 || W1
|-style=background:#cfc
| 56 || June 14 || @ Yankees|| 5–4 ||Gelnar||McDaniel||Segui|| 9,214 || 26–30 || W2
|-style=background:#fbb
| 57 || June 15 || @ Yankees|| 0–4 (6)||Bahnsen||Talbot|| — || 58,733 || 26–31 || L1
|-style=background:#fbb
| 58 || June 16 || @ White Sox|| 3–8 ||Wynne||Marshall|| — || 13,133 || 26–32 || L2
|-style=background:#bbb
| — || June 17 || @ White Sox|| colspan="7" |Postponed (Rescheduled September 17)
|-style=background:#fbb
| 59 || June 18 || @ White Sox|| 3–7 ||Peters||Brabender|| — || 6,044 || 26–33 || L3
|-style=background:#cfc
| 60 || June 18 || @ White Sox|| 6–5 (11)
|Locker
|Osinski
|—
|6,044
|27–33
|W1
|-style=background:#fbb
| 61 || June 19 || @ White Sox|| 10–13 ||Wood||Marshall|| — || 2,318 || 27–34 || L1
|-style=background:#cfc
| 62 || June 20 ||Royals|| 5–3 ||Talbot||Butler||Locker|| 18,413 || 28–34 || W1
|-style=background:#fbb
| 63 || June 20 ||Royals|| 2–6 ||Bunker||Gelnar|| — || 18,413 || 28–35 || L1
|-style=background:#cfc
| 64 || June 21 ||Royals|| 1–0 ||Brabender||Nelson|| — || 6,829 || 29–35 || W1
|-style=background:#cfc
| 65 || June 22 ||Royals || 5–1 ||Pattin||Drago||Locker|| 7,008 || 30–35 || W2
|-style=background:#bbb
| — || June 23 ||White Sox|| colspan="7" |Postponed (Rescheduled June 24)
|-style=background:#fbb
| 66 || June 24 ||White Sox|| 4–6 ||Wood||Locker|| — || 7,417 || 30–36 || L1
|-style=background:#fbb
| 67 || June 24 ||White Sox|| 6–7 ||Wood||Segui|| — || 7,417 || 30–37 || L2
|-style=background:#cfc
| 68 || June 25 ||White Sox|| 3–1 ||Gelnar||Edmondson||Locker|| 5,950 || 31–37 || W1
|-style=background:#cfc
| 69 || June 26 ||White Sox|| 3–2 ||Brabender||Horlen||—|| 7,109 || 32–37 || W2
|-style=background:#fbb
| 70 || June 27 ||@ Angels|| 3–5 ||Fisher||Pattin||—|| 9,518 || 32–38 || L1
|-style=background:#cfc
| 71 || June 27 ||@ Angels|| 5–2 ||Roggenburk||Washburn||Locker|| 9,518 || 33–38 || W1
|-style=background:#cfc
| 72 || June 28 ||@ Angels|| 3–0 ||Talbot||Murphy||Segui|| 8,893 || 34–38 || W2
|-style=background:#fbb
| 73 || June 29 ||@ Angels|| 2–8 ||Messersmith||Gelnar||Tatum|| 7,628 || 34–39 || L1
|-

|-style=background:#cfc
| 74 || July 1 || @ Athletics|| 7–1 ||Brabender||Dobson|| — || 5,375 || 35–39 || W1
|-style=background:#fbb
| 75 || July 2 || @ Athletics|| 0–5 ||Odom||Pattin|| — || 5,012 || 35–40 || L1
|-style=background:#fbb
| 76 || July 3 || @ Athletics|| 4–6 ||Krausse||Roggenburk||Fingers|| 8,290 || 35–41 || L2
|-style=background:#fbb
| 77 || July 4 || @ Royals|| 2–13 ||Nelson||Talbot|| — || 12,944 || 35–42 || L3
|-style=background:#fbb
| 78 || July 4 || @ Royals|| 2–3 ||Drago||Gelnar||O'Riley|| 12,944 || 35–43 || L4
|-style=background:#fbb
| 79 || July 5 || @ Royals|| 4–6 ||Burgmeier||Marshall||Drabowsky|| 10,268 || 35–44 || L5
|-style=background:#cfc
| 80 || July 6 || @ Royals|| 9–3 ||Brabender||Butler||Segui|| 26,480 || 36–44 || W1
|-style=background:#fbb
| 81 || July 7 ||Angels|| 1–5 ||Messersmith||Pattin|| — || 6,951 || 36–45 || L1
|-style=background:#cfc
| 82 || July 8 ||Angels|| 3–1 ||Roggenburk||McGlothlin|| — || 6,877 || 37–45 || W1
|-style=background:#cfc
| 83 || July 9 ||Angels|| 8–0 ||Talbot||Wright|| — || 8,461 || 38–45 || W2
|-style=background:#fbb
| 84 || July 9 ||Angels|| 0–5 ||Brunet||Gelnar|| — || 8,461 || 38–46 || L1
|-style=background:#fbb
| — || July 10 ||Angels|| colspan="7" |Postponed (Rescheduled September 12)
|-style=background:#fbb
| 85 || July 11 || @ Twins|| 3–9 ||Hall||Brabender|| — || 19,221 || 38–47 || L2
|-style=background:#fbb
| 86 || July 12 || @ Twins|| 1–11 ||Perry||Pattin|| — || 17,616 || 38–48 || L3
|-style=background:#fbb
| 87 || July 13 || @ Twins|| 2–5 ||Kaat||Roggenburk|| — || 26,123 || 38–49 || L4
|-style=background:#fbb
| 88 || July 13 || @ Twins|| 4–5 ||Perranoski||Segui|| — || 26,123 || 38–50 || L5
|-style="text-align:center; background:#fbb;"
|89
|July 15
|Athletics
|2–6
|Odom
|Gelnar
|—
|12,288
|38–51
|L6
|-style=background:#fbb
| 90 || July 16 ||Athletics|| 1–6 ||Krausse||Brabender|| — || 8,688 || 38–52 || L7
|-style=background:#fbb
| 91 || July 17 ||Athletics|| 2–8 ||Hunter||Pattin|| — || 6,793 || 38–53 || L8
|-style=background:#cfc
| 92 || July 18 ||Twins|| 2–1 ||Segui||Perranoski|| — || 14,134 || 39–53 || W1
|-style=background:#cfc
| 93 || July 18 ||Twins|| 3–2 ||Talbot||Boswell||O'Donoghue|| 14,134 || 40–53 || W2
|-style=background:#fbb
| 94 || July 19–20||Twins|| 7–11 (18)||Perry||Gelnar|| — || 12,069 || 40–54 || L1
|-style=background:#fbb
| 95 || July 20 ||Twins|| 0–4 ||Perry||Gelnar|| — || 8,287 || 40–55 || L2
|-style=background:#bbcaff
| — || July 23 || colspan="8" |40th Major League All-Star Game
|-style=background:#cfc
| 96 || July 24 ||Red Sox|| 8–6 ||Brabender||Jarvis||O'Donoghue|| 8,395 || 41–55 || W1
|-style=background:#fbb
| 97 || July 25 ||Red Sox|| 6–7 ||Landis||Gelnar||Stange|| 8,470 || 41–56 || L1
|-style=background:#cfc
| 98 || July 26 ||Red Sox|| 8–5 ||Bouton||Kline||Locker|| 13,632 || 42–56 || W1
|-style=background:#fbb
| 99 || July 27 ||Red Sox|| 3–5 (20)||Lonborg||Locker|| — || 9,670 || 42–57 || L1
|-style=background:#fbb
| 100 || July 29 ||Senators|| 2–4 ||Coleman||Brabender|| — || 14,270 || 42–58 || L2
|-style=background:#cfc
| 101 || July 30 ||Senators|| 4–3 ||Segui||Cox||Gelnar|| 5,721 || 43–58 || W1
|-style=background:#fbb
| 102 || July 31 ||Senators|| 6–7 ||Shellenback||Talbot||Knowles|| 9,699 || 43–59 || L1
|-

|-style=background:#fbb
| 103 || August 1 ||Yankees|| 2–4 ||Johnson||Pattin|| — || 7,596 || 43–60 || L2
|-style=background:#fbb
| 104 || August 2 ||Yankees|| 4–5 ||Downing||Brunet||Aker|| 10,755 || 43–61 || L3
|-style=background:#fbb
| 105 || August 3 ||Yankees|| 3–5 ||Bahnsen||Barber||McDaniel|| 23,657 || 43–62 || L4
|-style=background:#cfc
| 106 || August 5 || @ Red Sox|| 9–2 ||Brabender||Culp|| — || 25,977 || 44–62 || W1
|-style=background:#cfc
| 107 || August 6 || @ Red Sox|| 6–5 (10)||Locker||Romo|| — || 22,186 || 45–62 || W2
|-style=background:#fbb
| 108 || August 7 || @ Red Sox|| 4–5 ||Stange||Locker|| — || 30,706 || 45–63 || L1
|-style=background:#fbb
| 109 || August 8 || @ Senators|| 3–10 ||Coleman||Brunet||Baldwin|| 10,737 || 45–64 || L2
|-style=background:#cfc
| 110 || August 9 || @ Senators|| 8–6 ||Locker||Baldwin|| — || 8,482 || 46–64 || W1
|-style=background:#fbb
| 111 || August 10 || @ Senators|| 5–7 ||Knowles||Gelnar||Coleman|| 8,442 || 46–65 || L1
|-style=background:#cfc
| 112 || August 11 || @ Indians|| 8–2 ||Segui||Tiant|| — || 4,658 || 47–65 || W1
|-style=background:#fbb
| 113 || August 12 || @ Indians|| 5–6 ||Paul||Talbot||Williams|| 8,190 || 47–66 || L1
|-style=background:#cfc
| 114 || August 13 || @ Indians|| 5–3 ||Brunet||Hargan|| — || 5,494 || 48–66 || W1
|-style=background:#fbb
| 115 || August 15 ||Orioles|| 1–2 ||Cuellar||Brabender|| — || 9,922 || 48–67 || L1
|-style=background:#fbb
| 116 || August 16 ||Orioles|| 3–15 ||McNally||Segui||Hardin|| 11,550 || 48–68 || L2
|-style=background:#fbb
| 117 || August 17 ||Orioles|| 1–4 ||Phoebus||Talbot||Watt|| 10,227 || 48–69 || L3
|-style=background:#fbb
| 118 || August 18 ||Orioles|| 3–12 ||Palmer||Brunet|| — || 19,770 || 48–70 || L4
|-style=background:#fbb
| 119 || August 19 ||Tigers|| 3–5 ||Kilkenny||Barber||Dobson|| 5,909 || 48–71 || L5
|-style=background:#fbb
| 120 || August 20 ||Tigers|| 3–4 ||Lolich||Brabender|| — || 5,577 || 48–72 || L6
|-style=background:#fbb
| 121 || August 21 ||Tigers|| 6–7 ||Hiller||Bouton|| — || 6,483 || 48–73 || L7
|-style=background:#fbb
| 122 || August 22 ||Indians|| 8–9 ||Hargan||Talbot||Williams|| 6,720 || 48–74 || L8
|-style=background:#fbb
| 123 || August 23 ||Indians|| 3–7 ||McDowell||Pattin|| — || 5,469 || 48–75 || L9
|-style=background:#fbb
| 124 || August 24 ||Indians|| 5–6 ||Williams||Talbot||Law|| 5,900 || 48–76 || L10
|-style=background:#cfc
| 125 || August 26 || @ Orioles|| 2–1 ||Brabender||Phoebus|| — || 11,400 || 49–76 || W1
|-style=background:#fbb
| 126 || August 27 || @ Orioles|| 2–7 ||Cuellar||Brunet|| — || 8,960 || 49–77 || L1
|-style=background:#fbb
| 127 || August 28 || @ Orioles|| 3–4 (11)||Watt||Womack|| — || 8,118 || 49–78 || L2
|-style=background:#fbb
| 128 || August 29 || @ Tigers|| 1–6||Lolich||Barber|| — || 16,685|| 49–79||L3
|-style=background:#fbb
| 129 || August 30 || @ Tigers|| 3–4||McLain||O'Donoghue|| — || 17,550|| 49–80||L4
|-style=background:#fbb
| 130 || August 31 || @ Tigers|| 2–7||Wilson||Brabender|| — || 16,485|| 49–81||L5
|-

|-style=background:#fbb
| 131 || September 1 || @ Yankees|| 1–6||Stottlemyre||Brunet|| — || 15,387|| 49–82||L6
|-style=background:#cfc
| 132 || September 1 || @ Yankees|| 5–1 (13)||Womack||Hamilton|| — || 15,387|| 50–82||W1
|-style=background:#fbb
| 133 || September 2 || @ Yankees|| 4–5 (15)||Bahnsen||Brabender|| — || 7,071|| 50–83||L1
|-style=background:#fbb
| 134 || September 4 ||Royals|| 3–5||Drago||Gelnar|| — || 3,958|| 50–84||L2
|-style=background:#cfc
| 135 || September 5 ||Royals|| 5–4||Brabender||Drabowsky||Locker|| 6,903|| 51–84||W1
|-style=background:#fbb
| 136 || September 6 ||Royals|| 2–6||Bunker||Meyer|| — || 4,744|| 51–85||L1
|-style=background:#cfc
| 137 || September 7 ||Royals|| 7–6 (10)||Segui||Drabowsky|| — || 4,653|| 52–85||W1
|-style=background:#cfc
| 138 || September 8 ||White Sox|| 2–1||Barber||Johnson||Gelnar|| 10,831|| 53–85||W2
|-style=background:#cfc
| 139 || September 8 ||White Sox|| 5–1||Fuentes||Peters|| — || 10,831|| 54–85||W3
|-style=background:#cfc
| 140 || September 10 || @ Athletics|| 9–4||Brabender||Dobson||Segui|| 1,945|| 55–85||W4
|-style=background:#fbb
| 141 || September 11 || @ Athletics|| 3–6||Nash||Meyer||Talbot|| 1,721|| 55–86||L1
|-style=background:#cfc
| 142 || September 12 ||Angels|| 4–1||Brunet||May|| — || 5,085|| 56–86||W1
|-style=background:#bbb
| — || September 12 ||Angels|| 1–1 (10)|| —|| —|| — || 5,085|| 56–86||—
|-style=background:#cfc
| 143 || September 13 ||Angels|| 6–4||Segui||Murphy|| — || 11,184|| 57–86||W2
|-style=background:#fbb
| 144 || September 13 ||Angels|| 2–4||Fisher||Fuentes||Tatum|| 11,184|| 57–87||L1
|-style=background:#fbb
| 145 || September 14 ||Angels|| 2–4||Messersmith||Barber|| — || 4,216|| 57–88||L2
|-style=background:#cfc
| 146 || September 15 || @ Royals|| 3–2||Brabender||Cram||Segui|| 7,238|| 58–88||W1
|-style=background:#fbb
| 147 || September 16 || @ Royals|| 1–2||Bunker||Meyer|| — || 7,282|| 58–89||L1
|-style=background:#fbb
| 148 || September 17 || @ White Sox|| 4–6||Nyman||Pattin||Wood|| 3,643|| 58–90||L2
|-style=background:#fbb
| 149 || September 17 || @ White Sox|| 1–2||Wynne||Lockwood|| — || 3,643|| 58–91||L3
|-style=background:#fbb
| 150 || September 19 || @ Twins|| 1–2||Boswell||Barber|| — || 23,700|| 58–92||L4
|-style=background:#fbb
| 151 || September 20 || @ Twins|| 2–3||Perry||Segui|| — || 12,797|| 58–93||L5
|-style=background:#cfc
| 152 || September 21 || @ Twins|| 4–3||O'Donoghue||Kaat|| — || 15,443|| 59–93||W1
|-style=background:#cfc
| 153 || September 22 || @ Angels|| 5–4||Womack||Messersmith||Segui|| 5,158|| 60–93||W2
|-style=background:#fbb
| 154 || September 23 || @ Angels|| 4–5||Tatum||Fuentes|| — || 5,400|| 60–94||L1
|-style=background:#fbb
| 155 || September 24 || @ Angels|| 1–3||May||Brabender|| — || 5,728|| 60–95||L2
|-style=background:#cfc
| 156 || September 25 ||Twins|| 5–1||Barber||Kaat||O'Donoghue|| 3,642|| 61–95||W1
|-style=background:#cfc
| 157 || September 26 ||Twins|| 4–3 (14)||Gelnar||Hall|| — || 6,586|| 62–95||W2
|-style=background:#bbb
| — || September 27 ||Twins|| colspan="7" |Postponed (Rescheduled September 28)
|-style=background:#fbb
| 158 || September 28 ||Twins|| 2–5||Boswell||Fuentes||Perranoski|| 8,096|| 62–96||L1
|-style=background:#cfc
| 159 || September 28 ||Twins|| 4–1||Baney||Miller||Segui|| 8,096|| 63–96||W1
|-style=background:#fbb
| 160 || September 30 ||Athletics|| 4–8||Dobson||Brabender||Krausse|| 2,937|| 63–97||L1
|-

|-style=background:#cfc
| 161 || October 1 ||Athletics|| 4–3||Segui||Lindblad|| — || 3,612|| 64–97||W1
|-style=background:#fbb
| 162 || October 2 ||Athletics|| 1–3||Roland||Barber|| — || 5,473|| 64–98||L1
|-

|- style="text-align:center;"
| Legend:       = Win       = Loss       = Postponement/TieBold = Pilots team member

Player stats

Batting

Starters by position 
Note: Pos = Position; G = Games played; AB = At bats; H = Hits; Avg. = Batting average; HR = Home runs; RBI = Runs batted in

Other batters 
Note: G = Games played; AB = At bats; H = Hits; Avg. = Batting average; HR = Home runs; RBI = Runs batted in

Pitching

Starting pitchers 
Note: G = Games pitched; IP = Innings pitched; W = Wins; L = Losses; ERA = Earned run average; SO = Strikeouts

Other pitchers 
Note: G = Games pitched; IP = Innings pitched; W = Wins; L = Losses; SV = Saves; ERA = Earned run average; SO = Strikeouts

Relief pitchers 
Note: G = Games pitched; IP = Innings pitched; W = Wins; L = Losses; SV = Saves; ERA = Earned run average; SO = Strikeouts

Farm system

The Pilots' farm system consisted of four minor league affiliates in 1969. The Triple-A Vancouver Mounties were shared with the Montreal Expos.

Awards and honors 
1969 Major League Baseball All-Star Game
 Don Mincher
 Mike Hegan (reserve, did not play)

Notes

References
1969 Seattle Pilots: Batting, Pitching, & Fielding Statistics. Baseball-Reference.com
1969 Seattle Pilots Roster webpage. Baseball Almanac website

Further reading
Allen, Rick (2020). Inside Pitch: Insiders Reveal How the Ill-Fated Seattle Pilots Got Played into Bankruptcy in One Year. Tacoma, WA: Persistence Press. .
Bouton, Jim (1970). Ball Four. New York: World Publishing. .
Hogan, Kenneth (2006). The 1969 Seattle Pilots: Major League Baseball's One-Year Team. Jefferson, North Carolina: McFarland. .
Mullins, Bill (2013). Becoming Big League: Seattle, the Pilots, and Stadium Politics. Seattle, WA: University of Washington Press. .

Milwaukee Brewers seasons
Seattle Pilots season
Seattle Pilots
Inaugural Major League Baseball seasons by team
Seattle Pilots